Smith Opera House, also known as the Geneva Theater, the Smith, and Smith's Opera House, is a historic theater building located at Geneva in Ontario County, New York. It was constructed in 1894 and is a -story, detached brick-and-stone building.  It was built by one of Geneva's most respected citizens, William Smith.  It was renovated in 1931 as a movie theater by architect Victor Rigaumount in a unique combination of Art Deco and Baroque motifs. At one time, it was part of the Schine Theater Chain and was substantially redecorated and redesigned under their ownership. In the late 1960s the theater changed to the ownership of Panther Enterprises and was renamed simply The Geneva Theater. The Geneva Theatre was renamed Smith Opera House in 1983.

It was listed on the National Register of Historic Places in 1979. It is located in the Geneva Commercial Historic District.

References

External links
Cinema Treasures | Smith Opera House
The Smith Opera House website

Theatres on the National Register of Historic Places in New York (state)
Houses completed in 1894
Art Deco architecture in New York (state)
Buildings and structures in Ontario County, New York
Tourist attractions in Ontario County, New York
Geneva, New York
National Register of Historic Places in Ontario County, New York
Historic district contributing properties in New York (state)
Opera houses on the National Register of Historic Places in New York (state)
Opera houses in New York (state)